Sheydan or Shidan may refer to:
 Sheydan, Chaharmahal and Bakhtiari
 Sheydan, Bavanat, Fars Province
 Sheydan, Sepidan, Fars Province
 Shidan, Isfahan
 Sheydan Baraan, Isfahan Province
 Sheydan, West Azerbaijan
 Sheydan, Urmia, West Azerbaijan Province